Shoki Mokgapa (17 August 1984 – 26 September 2018) was a South African actress. She was best known for her role as Rachel in the film Sink.

Early life
Mokgapa was born in Johannesburg. She had a brother Tshepiso and a stepsister Ntsako Mokadikwa. She spent her early childhood in Soweto before her family moved to Johannesburg's northern suburbs. Fluent in English and SeSotho, Mokgapa attended Michael Mount Waldorf School and took A Levels at the British International College. She pursued a Bachelor of Communications before going on to train at the Johannesburg campus of AFDA, graduating with a Bachelor of Arts in Performing Arts.

Career
In 2008, Mokgapa made her television debut in the second season of the SABC3 drama series The Lab. In the series, she played the role of Tumi, the Pearl Lusipho's personal assistant, for three seasons.

Mokgapa was "instrumental" in helping to co-found the POPArt Theatre at the Maboneng Precinct, which opened its doors in 2011.

On British television, Mokgapa appeared in the ITV series Wild at Heart in 2008 and then in the BBC drama Silent Witness in 2010. Meanwhile, she appeared in Hollywood films such as Retribution (2011) and Dredd (2012). In 2013, she appeared in the second season of the SABC1 drama Intersexions as Gadima. That same year, she made a minor role in the biographical film Mandela: Long Walk to Freedom.

In 2015, she gained prominence through her role as Disebo in the second season of the e.tv soap opera Ashes to Ashes. In 2016, she appeared in the Sri Lankan feature film A Love Like This directed by Chandran Rutnam which was shot in the Seychelles.<ref>Harija Amia & Sharon Uranie, Telling African stories in paradise – Seychelles film industry gets big boost with Africa Film Factory , Seychelles News Agency, July 8, 2014.</ref>

In 2017, Mokgapa played Rachel Nyaga in the Afrikaans-language film Sink. For her performance, she won Best Actress in a Feature Film category at the 11th Annual South African Film and Television Awards (SAFTAs). Then in 2018, she won the Best Actress Award at the kykNET Silwerskermfees Festival for the same role, becoming the first non-Afrikaans speaking actress to win the award. In mid 2018, she appeared in the Amazon Prime Video miniseries The Looming Tower. She made her final film appearance in Jahmil X.T. Qubeka's Sew the Winter to My Skin'', South Africa's 2019 submission in the Oscars' foreign film category.

Death
Mokgapa suffered from clinical depression and anxiety for a long time. She committed suicide on 25 September 2018 in Johannesburg at the age of 34.

A memorial event was held on 2 October 2018 at the Market Theatre.

Filmography

Film

Television

Awards and nominations

References

External links
 
 Shoki Mokgapa at TVSA

1984 births
2018 deaths
21st-century South African actresses
Actresses from Johannesburg
People from Soweto
South African film actresses
South African television actresses
South African Sotho people
Suicides in South Africa